The North Dakota Senate is the upper house of the North Dakota Legislative Assembly, smaller than the North Dakota House of Representatives.

Per the state constitution, North Dakota is divided into between 40 and 54 legislative districts apportioned by population as determined by the decennial census.  The 2000 redistricting plan provided for 47 districts, with one senator elected from each district.

Senators serve four-year terms. Elections are staggered such that half the senate districts have elections every two years. In the 2022 North Dakota elections, a ballot measure passed with 63.4% of the vote creating term limits of eight years in the North Dakota Senate, which was put into effect starting January 2023.

The Senate Chamber is located in the North Dakota State Capitol in Bismarck, North Dakota.

Composition
68th Legislative Assembly (2023–2025)

2023 Officers

Members of the 68th Senate

Past composition of the Senate

See also
 List of presidents pro tempore of the North Dakota Senate
List of majority leaders of the North Dakota Senate

References

External links
North Dakota Legislative Assembly official website
North Dakota Senate at Ballotpedia
 Legislature of North Dakota at Project Vote Smart
North Dakota campaign financing at FollowTheMoney.org

North Dakota Legislative Assembly
State upper houses in the United States